Logic  is the formal science of using reason and is considered a branch of both philosophy and mathematics and to a lesser extent computer science. Logic investigates and classifies the structure of statements and arguments, both through the study of formal systems of inference and the study of arguments in natural language. The scope of logic can therefore be very large, ranging from core topics such as the study of fallacies and paradoxes, to specialized analyses of reasoning such as probability, correct reasoning, and arguments involving causality. One of the aims of logic is to identify the correct (or valid) and incorrect (or fallacious) inferences. Logicians study the criteria for the evaluation of arguments.

Foundations of logic 

Philosophy of logic
 Analytic-synthetic distinction
 Antinomy
 A priori and a posteriori
 Definition
 Description
 Entailment
 Identity (philosophy)
 Inference
 Logical form
 Logical implication
 Logical truth
 Logical consequence
 Name
 Necessity
 Material conditional
 Meaning (linguistic)
 Meaning (non-linguistic)
 Paradox  (list)
 Possible world
 Presupposition
 Probability
 Quantification
 Reason
 Reasoning
 Reference
 Semantics
 Strict conditional
 Syntax (logic)
 Truth
 Truth value
 Validity

Branches of logic 

 Affine logic
 Alethic logic
 Aristotelian logic
 Boolean logic
 Buddhist logic
 Bunched logic
 Categorical logic
 Classical logic
 Computability logic
 Deontic logic
 Dependence logic
 Description logic
 Deviant logic
 Doxastic logic
 Epistemic logic
 First-order logic
 Formal logic
 Free logic
 Fuzzy logic
 Higher-order logic
 Infinitary logic
 Informal logic
 Intensional logic
 Intermediate logic
 Interpretability logic
 Intuitionistic logic
 Linear logic
 Many-valued logic
 Mathematical logic
 Metalogic
 Minimal logic
 Modal logic
 Narrative logic
 Non-Aristotelian logic
 Non-classical logic
 Noncommutative logic
 Non-monotonic logic
 Ordered logic
 Paraconsistent logic
 Philosophical logic
 Predicate logic
 Propositional logic
 Provability logic
 Quantum logic
 Relevance logic
 Sequential logic
 Strict logic
 Substructural logic
 Syllogistic logic
 Symbolic logic
 Temporal logic
 Term logic
 Topical logic
 Traditional logic
 Zeroth-order logic

Philosophical logic

Informal logic and critical thinking 
Informal logic
Critical thinking
Argumentation theory
 Argument
 Argument map
 Accuracy and precision
 Ad hoc hypothesis
 Ambiguity
 Analysis
 Attacking Faulty Reasoning
 Belief
 Belief bias
 Bias
 Cognitive bias
 Confirmation bias
 Credibility
 Critical pedagogy
 Critical reading
 Decidophobia
 Decision making
 Dispositional and occurrent belief
 Emotional reasoning
 Evidence
 Expert
 Explanation
 Explanatory power
 Fact
 Fallacy
 Higher-order thinking
 Inquiry
 Interpretive discussion
 Narrative logic
 Occam's razor
 Opinion
 Practical syllogism
 Precision questioning
 Propaganda
 Propaganda techniques
 Prudence
 Pseudophilosophy
 Reasoning
 Relevance
 Rhetoric
 Rigour
 Socratic questioning
 Source credibility
 Source criticism
 Theory of justification
 Topical logic
 Vagueness

Deductive reasoning

Theories of deduction 
Anti-psychologism
Conceptualism
Constructivism
Conventionalism
Counterpart theory
Deflationary theory of truth
Dialetheism
Fictionalism
Formalism (philosophy)
Game theory
Illuminationist philosophy
Logical atomism
Logical holism
Logicism
Modal fictionalism
Nominalism
Polylogism
Pragmatism
Preintuitionism
Proof theory
Psychologism
Ramism
Semantic theory of truth
Sophism
Trivialism
Ultrafinitism

Fallacies 

 Fallacy  (list) – incorrect argumentation in reasoning resulting in a misconception or presumption. By accident or design, fallacies may exploit emotional triggers in the listener or interlocutor (appeal to emotion), or take advantage of social relationships between people (e.g. argument from authority). Fallacious arguments are often structured using rhetorical patterns that obscure any logical argument. Fallacies can be used to win arguments regardless of the merits.  There are dozens of types of fallacies.

Formal logic 

 Formal logic – Mathematical logic, symbolic logic and formal logic are largely, if not completely synonymous. The essential feature of this field is the use of formal languages to express the ideas whose logical validity is being studied.
 List of mathematical logic topics

Symbols and strings of symbols

Logical symbols 

Logical variables
Propositional variable
Predicate variable
Literal
Metavariable
Logical constants
Logical connective
Quantifier
Identity
Brackets

Logical connectives 
Logical connective
 Converse implication
 Converse nonimplication
 Exclusive or
 Logical NOR
 Logical biconditional
 Logical conjunction
 Logical disjunction
 Material implication
 Material nonimplication
 Negation
 Sheffer stroke

Strings of symbols 

Atomic formula
Open sentence

Types of propositions 

Proposition
 Analytic proposition
 Axiom
 Atomic sentence
 Clause (logic)
 Contingent proposition
 Contradiction
 Logical truth
 Propositional formula
 Rule of inference
 Sentence (mathematical logic)
 Sequent
 Statement (logic)
 Subalternation
 Tautology
 Theorem

Rules of inference 

Rule of inference  (list)
 Biconditional elimination
 Biconditional introduction
 Case analysis
 Commutativity of conjunction
 Conjunction introduction
 Constructive dilemma
 Contraposition (traditional logic)
 Conversion (logic)
 De Morgan's laws
 Destructive dilemma
 Disjunction elimination
 Disjunction introduction
 Disjunctive syllogism
 Double negation elimination
 Generalization (logic)
 Hypothetical syllogism
 Law of excluded middle
 Law of identity
 Modus ponendo tollens
 Modus ponens
 Modus tollens
 Obversion
 Principle of contradiction
 Resolution (logic)
 Simplification
 Transposition (logic)

Formal theories 

Formal proof
List of first-order theories

Expressions in a metalanguage 

Metalanguage
 Metalinguistic variable
 Deductive system
 Metatheorem
 Metatheory
 Interpretation

Propositional and boolean logic

Propositional logic 

Propositional logic
 Absorption law
 Clause (logic)
 Deductive closure
 Distributive property
 Entailment
 Formation rule
 Functional completeness
 Intermediate logic
 Literal (mathematical logic)
 Logical connective
 Logical consequence
 Negation normal form
 Open sentence
 Propositional calculus
 Propositional formula
 Propositional variable
 Rule of inference
 Strict conditional
 Substitution instance
 Truth table
 Zeroth-order logic

Boolean logic 
 Boolean algebra   (list)
 Boolean logic
 Boolean algebra (structure)
 Boolean algebras canonically defined
 Introduction to Boolean algebra
 Complete Boolean algebra
 Free Boolean algebra
 Monadic Boolean algebra
 Residuated Boolean algebra
 Two-element Boolean algebra
 Modal algebra
 Derivative algebra (abstract algebra)
 Relation algebra
 Absorption law
 Laws of Form
 De Morgan's laws
 Algebraic normal form
 Canonical form (Boolean algebra)
 Boolean conjunctive query
 Boolean-valued model
 Boolean domain
 Boolean expression
 Boolean ring
 Boolean function
 Boolean-valued function
 Parity function
 Symmetric Boolean function
 Conditioned disjunction
 Field of sets
 Functional completeness
 Implicant
 Logic alphabet
 Logic redundancy
 Logical connective
 Logical matrix
 Product term
 True quantified Boolean formula
 Truth table

Predicate logic and relations

Predicate logic 

Predicate logic

 Atomic formula
 Atomic sentence
 Domain of discourse
 Empty domain
 Extension (predicate logic)
 First-order logic
 First-order predicate
 Formation rule
 Free variables and bound variables
 Generalization (logic)
 Monadic predicate calculus
 Predicate (mathematical logic)
 Predicate logic
 Predicate variable
 Quantification
 Second-order predicate
 Sentence (mathematical logic)
 Universal instantiation

Relations 

Mathematical relation
 Finitary relation
 Antisymmetric relation
 Asymmetric relation
 Bijection
 Bijection, injection and surjection
 Binary relation
 Composition of relations
 Congruence relation
 Connected relation
 Converse relation
 Coreflexive relation
 Covering relation
 Cyclic order
 Dense relation
 Dependence relation
 Dependency relation
 Directed set
 Equivalence relation
 Euclidean relation
 Homogeneous relation
 Idempotence
 Intransitivity
 Involutive relation
 Partial equivalence relation
 Partial function
 Partially ordered set
 Preorder
 Prewellordering
 Propositional function
 Quasitransitive relation
 Reflexive relation
 Serial relation
 Surjective function
 Symmetric relation
 Ternary relation
 Transitive relation
 Trichotomy (mathematics)
 Well-founded relation

Mathematical logic 
Mathematical logic

Set theory 
Set theory  (list)
 Aleph null
 Bijection, injection and surjection
 Binary set
 Cantor's diagonal argument
 Cantor's first uncountability proof
 Cantor's theorem
 Cardinality of the continuum
 Cardinal number
 Codomain
 Complement (set theory)
 Constructible universe
 Continuum hypothesis
 Countable set
 Decidable set
 Denumerable set
 Disjoint sets
 Disjoint union
 Domain of a function
 Effective enumeration
 Element (mathematics)
 Empty function
 Empty set
 Enumeration
 Extensionality
 Finite set 
 Forcing (mathematics)
 Function (set theory)
 Function composition
 Generalized continuum hypothesis
 Index set
 Infinite set
 Intension
 Intersection (set theory)
 Inverse function
 Large cardinal
 Löwenheim–Skolem theorem
 Map (mathematics)
 Multiset
 Morse–Kelley set theory
 Naïve set theory
 One-to-one correspondence
 Ordered pair
 Partition of a set
 Pointed set
 Power set
 Projection (set theory)
 Proper subset
 Proper superset
 Range of a function
 Russell's paradox
 Sequence (mathematics)
 Set (mathematics)
 Set of all sets
 Simple theorems in the algebra of sets
 Singleton (mathematics)
 Skolem paradox
 Subset
 Superset
 Tuple
 Uncountable set
 Union (set theory)
 Von Neumann–Bernays–Gödel set theory
 Zermelo set theory
 Zermelo–Fraenkel set theory

Metalogic 
Metalogic – The study of the metatheory of logic.
 Completeness (logic)
 Syntax (logic)
 Consistency
 Decidability (logic)
 Deductive system
 Interpretation (logic)
 Cantor's theorem
 Church's theorem
 Church's thesis
 Effective method
 Formal system
 Gödel's completeness theorem
 Gödel's first incompleteness theorem
 Gödel's second incompleteness theorem
 Independence (mathematical logic)
 Logical consequence
 Löwenheim–Skolem theorem
 Metalanguage
 Metasyntactic variable
 Metatheorem
 Object language
 Symbol (formal)
 Type–token distinction
 Use–mention distinction
 Well-formed formula

Proof theory 
Proof theory – The study of deductive apparatus.
 Axiom
 Deductive system
 Formal proof
 Formal system
 Formal theorem
 Syntactic consequence
 Syntax (logic)
 Transformation rules

Model theory 
Model theory – The study of interpretation of formal systems.
 Interpretation (logic)
 Logical validity
 Non-standard model
 Normal model
 Model
 Semantic consequence
 Truth value

Computability theory 
Computability theory – branch of mathematical logic that originated in the 1930s with the study of computable functions and Turing degrees. The field has grown to include the study of generalized computability and definability. The basic questions addressed by recursion theory are "What does it mean for a function from the natural numbers to themselves to be computable?" and "How can noncomputable functions be classified into a hierarchy based on their level of noncomputability?". The answers to these questions have led to a rich theory that is still being actively researched.
 Alpha recursion theory
 Arithmetical set
 Church–Turing thesis
 Computability logic
 Computable function
 Computation
 Decision problem
 Effective method
 Entscheidungsproblem
 Enumeration
 Forcing (recursion theory)
 Halting problem
 History of the Church–Turing thesis
 Lambda calculus
 List of undecidable problems
 Post correspondence problem
 Post's theorem
 Primitive recursive function
 Recursion (computer science)
 Recursive language
 Recursive set
 Recursively enumerable language
 Recursively enumerable set
 Reduction (recursion theory)
 Turing machine

Semantics of natural language 

Formal semantics (natural language)

Formal systems
 Alternative semantics
 Categorial grammar
 Combinatory categorial grammar
 Discourse representation theory
 Dynamic semantics
 Inquisitive semantics
 Montague grammar
 Situation semantics

Concepts
 Compositionality
 Counterfactuals
 Generalized quantifier
 Mereology
 Modality (natural language)
 Opaque context
 Presupposition
 Propositional attitudes
 Scope (formal semantics)
 Type shifter
 Vagueness

Classical logic 
Classical logic
 Properties of classical logics:
 Law of the excluded middle
 Double negation elimination
 Law of noncontradiction
 Principle of explosion
 Monotonicity of entailment
 Idempotency of entailment
 Commutativity of conjunction
 De Morgan duality – every logical operator is dual to another
 Term logic
 General concepts in classical logic
 Baralipton
 Baroco
 Bivalence
 Boolean logic
 Boolean-valued function
 Categorical proposition
 Distribution of terms
 End term
 Enthymeme
 Immediate inference
 Law of contraries
 Logical connective
 Logical cube
 Logical hexagon
 Major term
 Middle term
 Minor term
 Octagon of Prophecies
 Organon
 Polysyllogism
 Port-Royal Logic
 Premise
 Prior Analytics
 Relative term
 Sorites paradox
 Square of opposition
 Sum of Logic
 Syllogism
 Tetralemma
 Truth function

Modal logic 
Modal logic
 Alethic logic
 Deontic logic
 Doxastic logic
 Epistemic logic
 Temporal logic

Non-classical logic 
Non-classical logic

 Affine logic
 Bunched logic
 Computability logic
 Decision theory
 Description logic
 Deviant logic
 Free logic
 Fuzzy logic
 Game theory
 Intensional logic
 Intuitionistic logic
 Linear logic
 Many-valued logic
 Minimal logic
 Non-monotonic logic
 Noncommutative logic
 Paraconsistent logic
 Probability theory
 Quantum logic
 Relevance logic
 Strict logic
 Substructural logic

Concepts of logic 
 Deductive reasoning
 Inductive reasoning
 Abductive reasoning
Mathematical logic
 Proof theory
 Set theory
 Formal system
 Predicate logic
 Predicate
 Higher-order logic
 Propositional calculus
 Proposition
 Boolean algebra
 Boolean logic
 Truth value
 Venn diagram
 Peirce's law
 Aristotelian logic
 Non-Aristotelian logic
 Informal logic
 Fuzzy logic
 Infinitary logic
 Infinity
 Categorical logic
 Linear logic
 Metalogic
 order
 Ordered logic
 Temporal logic
 Linear temporal logic
 Linear temporal logic to Büchi automaton
 Sequential logic
 Provability logic
 Interpretability logic
 Interpretability
 Quantum logic
 Relevant logic
 Consequent
 Affirming the consequent
 Antecedent
 Denying the antecedent
 Theorem
 Axiom
 Axiomatic system
 Axiomatization
 Conditional proof
 Invalid proof
 Degree of truth
 Truth
 Truth condition
 Truth function
 Double negation
 Double negation elimination
 Fallacy
 Existential fallacy
 Logical fallacy
 Syllogistic fallacy
 Type theory
 Game theory
 Game semantics
 Rule of inference
 Inference procedure
 Inference rule
 Introduction rule
 Law of excluded middle
 Law of non-contradiction
 Logical constant
 Logical connective
 Quantifier
 Logic gate
 Boolean Function
 Quantum logic gate
 Tautology
 Logical assertion
 Logical conditional
 Logical biconditional
 Logical equivalence
 Logical AND
 Negation
 Logical OR
 Logical NAND
 Logical NOR
 Contradiction
 Subalternation
 Logicism
 Polysyllogism
 Syllogism
 Hypothetical syllogism
 Major premise
 Minor premise
 Term
 Singular term
 Major term
 Middle term
 Quantification
 Plural quantification
 Logical argument
 Validity
 Soundness
 Inverse (logic)
 Non sequitur
 Tolerance
 Satisfiability
 Logical language
 Paradox
 Polish notation
 Principia Mathematica
 Quod erat demonstrandum
 Reductio ad absurdum
 Rhetoric
 Self-reference
 Necessary and sufficient
 Sufficient condition
 Nonfirstorderizability
 Occam's Razor
 Socratic dialogue
 Socratic method
 Argument form
 Logic programming
 Unification

History of logic 

History of logic

Literature about logic

Journals 
 Journal of Logic, Language and Information
 Journal of Philosophical Logic
 Linguistics and Philosophy

Books 
 A System of Logic
 Attacking Faulty Reasoning
 Begriffsschrift
 Categories (Aristotle)
 Charles Sanders Peirce bibliography
 De Interpretatione
 Gödel, Escher, Bach
 Introduction to Mathematical Philosophy
 Language, Truth, and Logic
 Laws of Form
 Novum Organum
 On Formally Undecidable Propositions of Principia Mathematica and Related Systems
 Organon
 Philosophy of Arithmetic
 Polish Logic
 Port-Royal Logic
 Posterior Analytics
 Principia Mathematica
 Principles of Mathematical Logic
 Prior Analytics
 Rhetoric (Aristotle)
 Sophistical Refutations
 Sum of Logic
 The Art of Being Right
 The Foundations of Arithmetic
 Topics (Aristotle)
 Tractatus Logico-Philosophicus

Logic organizations 

 Association for Symbolic Logic

Logicians

 List of logicians
 List of philosophers of language

See also 

 Index of logic articles
 Mathematics
 List of basic mathematics topics
 List of mathematics articles
 Philosophy
 List of basic philosophy topics
 List of philosophy topics
 Outline of discrete mathematics – for introductory set theory and other supporting material

External links

 Taxonomy of Logical Fallacies
 forall x: an introduction to formal logic, by P.D. Magnus, covers sentential and quantified logic
 Translation Tips, by Peter Suber, for translating from English into logical notation
 Math & Logic: The history of formal mathematical, logical, linguistic and methodological ideas. In The Dictionary of the History of Ideas.
 Logic test Test your logic skills
 Logic Self-Taught: A Workbook  (originally prepared for on-line logic instruction)

 
Logic
Logic
Mathematical logic
Logic